RH-34 is a compound which acts as a potent and selective partial agonist for the 5-HT2A serotonin receptor subtype. It was derived by structural modification of the selective 5-HT2A antagonist ketanserin, with the 4-(p-fluorobenzoyl)piperidine moiety replaced by the N-(2-methoxybenzyl) pharmacophore found in such potent 5-HT2A agonists as NBOMe-2C-B and NBOMe-2C-I. This alteration was found to retain 5-HT2A affinity and selectivity, but reversed activity from an antagonist to a moderate efficacy partial agonist.

Legal status 
RH-34 is a controlled substance in Hungary and Brazil.

See also 
 5-MeO-NBpBrT
 IHCH-7113
 Ketanserin
 Efavirenz

References 

Amines
Quinazolines
Serotonin receptor agonists
Pyrimidinediones
Phenol ethers
Abandoned drugs